The 2012 AFL draft consisted of five opportunities for player acquisitions during the 2012/13 Australian Football League off-season.

These were:
2012 trade period; which was held between 1 October and 26 October, and for the first time incorporated a free agency eligibility period.
A mini-draft of 17-year-old players, as part of the recruitment concessions given to the newly established Greater Western Sydney Giants, held on 26 October
The 2012 national draft; which was conducted on 22 November at the Gold Coast Convention Centre.
The 2013 pre-season draft which was held on 11 December 2012 and
The 2013 rookie draft, also held on 11 December 2012.

Player movements

Geelong have reached an agreement with Gold Coast regarding Josh Caddy, which would involve Geelong's mid-first-round compensation pick, for losing Gary Ablett Jr. to the Suns and other picks to be confirmed, with paperwork for this trade to be lodged to the AFL at a later date.

Free agency
During the 2012 AFL season, in the leadup to the first ever free agency trade period, there was speculation about high-profile players who had contracts that expired at the end of the season, including Travis Cloke, Travis Boak, Brendon Goddard and Troy Chaplin. However, during the season, Cloke and Boak both re-signed with their current clubs.  Brent Moloney from  became the first player to announce that he would become a free agent He was followed by Carlton pair Bret Thornton and Jordan Russell, West Coast's Quinten Lynch and Port Adelaide's Steven Salopek to declare themselves as free agents.

The initial list of free agents, published in March 2012, consisted of 62 unrestricted free agents and 19 restricted free agents. A restricted free agent is a player who has served eight or more seasons of AFL football at one club, is one of the top 25 per cent highest-paid players at his club, and is now out of contract for the first time since reaching eight seasons of service. Unrestricted free agents are players who have been delisted by their club, played more than ten seasons at one AFL club or has played eight or more seasons at one club and is not one of the top 25 per cent highest-paid players at his club. Restricted free agents must allow their current club to match any offer from a rival club, whereas unrestricted free agents are free to sign with any other club.

The final free agents list issued on 27 September in the week before the trade period commenced consisted of 28 unrestricted free agents and six restricted free agents, reflecting the number of players that had either re-signed with their current club or retired from the AFL.

Trades

Note: the numbering of the draft picks in this trades table may be different to the draft picks known at the time of the trade due to adjustments due to either the insertion of compensation draft picks, Adelaide relinquishing their first two selections or clubs exiting the draft before the later rounds.

Retirements and delistings

Mini-draft
As part of their entry concessions,  was allocated up to four selections in a mini-draft, which could be used to recruit seventeen-year-olds who would not otherwise be eligible for that year's national draft. These players could not play senior AFL football until the 2014 season. GWS could not use these draft picks themselves, but could trade them to other clubs prior to either the 2011 or 2012 AFL Drafts. In 2011,  and  negotiated trades with GWS for selections in this draft and selected Jaeger O'Meara and Brad Crouch.  The two remaining selections for the 2012 mini-draft were obtained by the Gold Coast (pick No. 1) and Melbourne (pick No. 2). Western Australian youngsters Jack Martin and Jesse Hogan were widely expected to be taken with the two Mini-draft picks.

2012 national draft
The 2012 AFL national draft was held on 22 November at the Gold Coast Convention Centre.

During the free agency and trade period, the Adelaide Football Club was investigated for draft tampering and breaches of the salary cap relating to the 2009 contract extension of Kurt Tippett, who was seeking a trade. Adelaide was likely to incur a loss of draft picks, among other penalties, if found guilty, but the AFL Commission was yet to complete its hearing into the matter when the National Draft was held, so the club was permitted to participate in this year's draft as normal. However, on the day before the draft, the club voluntarily relinquished its highest two remaining selections (No. 20 and 54) as a "gesture of goodwill" ahead of the hearing. When the final penalties were handed down on 30 November, Adelaide was also stripped of its first and second round draft picks in the 2013 National Draft, as well as receiving a fine; Tippett received an 11-match suspension, and a fine.
 

Source: AFL Draft Order
Notes:
Compensation picks are selections in addition to the normal order of selection, allocated to clubs by the AFL as compensation for losing uncontracted players to the new expansion clubs, Gold Coast and Greater Western Sydney.  The picks can be held for up to five years and clubs declare at the beginning of the season of their intent to utilise the pick at the end of the season.  Picks could be traded to other clubs in return for players or other draft selections.
free agency compensation picks are additional selections awarded to teams based on their net loss of players during the free agency trade period.
Promoted rookies are players who are transferred from a club's rookie list to their primary list.
Local talent selections are local zone selections available to the new expansion clubs.

2013 pre-season draft
The 2013 AFL pre-season draft was held on 11 December 2012.

2013 rookie draft
The 2013 AFL rookie draft was held on 11 December 2012.

References 

Australian Football League draft
Draft
AFL Draft
AFL Draft
2010s in Queensland
Australian rules football in Queensland
Sport on the Gold Coast, Queensland
Events in Queensland